Edward P. Barry (November 28, 1864 – September 2, 1936) was an American politician who served as the 44th Lieutenant Governor for the Commonwealth of Massachusetts from 1914 to 1915.

References

Lieutenant Governors of Massachusetts
1864 births
1936 deaths
Massachusetts Democrats